Engine House No. 9 in Tacoma, Washington, is a fire station built in 1907. The building was placed on the National Register of Historic Places in 1975.

It hosted horse-drawn fire equipment from 1908 until the first motorized equipment was bought in 1919.  When eventually a replacement station was being completed, the 1965 Puget Sound earthquake shook the building and it was abruptly abandoned.  It was reopened in 1973 as a restaurant and bar and was "the city's first historic building to be restored and put to a commercial use by private enterprise."

The building remains a neighborhood restaurant and also houses an award-winning microbrewery of the same name.

References

External links
 of the modern pub

 Fire stations completed in 1907
 Defunct fire stations in Washington (state)
 National Register of Historic Places in Tacoma, Washington
 Buildings and structures in Tacoma, Washington
 Fire stations on the National Register of Historic Places in Washington (state)